Frydendal is a settlement on the island of St. Thomas in the United States Virgin Islands. It is located in the east of the island.

Coral World Ocean Park and Coki Beach are located in Frydendal.

Populated places in Saint Thomas, U.S. Virgin Islands
East End, Saint Thomas, U.S. Virgin Islands